What Dreams Are Made Of is the debut album by production duo Rock City. It was released on October 9, 2015. The album includes "Locked Away", which features Maroon 5 lead vocalist Adam Levine. The single peaked at number one on the Billboard Mainstream Top 40 chart.

Track listing

Notes
"Locked Away" borrows its hook from Captain & Tennille's 1979 single "Do That to Me One More Time", written by Toni Tennille.
"Over" is built on heavy sampling from Lenny Kravitz's 1991 single "It Ain't Over 'til It's Over".

Charts

References

2015 debut albums
Rock City (duo) albums
Albums produced by Dr. Luke
Albums produced by Cirkut
RCA Records albums
Kemosabe Records albums